Mendocino County (Mendocino, Spanish for "of Mendoza) is a county located on the North Coast of the U.S. state of California. As of the 2020 census, the population was 91,601. The county seat is Ukiah.

Mendocino County consists wholly of the Ukiah, CA Micropolitan Statistical Area (μSA) for the purposes of the U.S. Census Bureau. It is located approximately equidistant from the San Francisco Bay Area and California/Oregon border, separated from the Sacramento Valley to the east by the California Coast Ranges. While smaller areas of redwood forest are found further south, it is the southernmost California county to be included in the World Wildlife Fund's Pacific temperate rainforests ecoregion, the largest temperate rainforest ecoregion on the planet.

The county is noted for its distinctive Pacific Ocean coastline, its location along California's "Lost Coast",  Redwood forests, wine production, microbrews, and liberal views about the use of cannabis and support for its legalization. In 2009, it was estimated that roughly one-third of the economy was based on the cultivation of marijuana.

The notable historic and recreational attraction of the "Skunk Train" connects Fort Bragg with Willits in Mendocino County via a steam-locomotive engine, along with other vehicles.

Mendocino is one of three Northern California counties to make up the "Emerald Triangle", along with Humboldt and Trinity counties.

History

Mendocino County was one of the original counties of California, created in 1850 at the time of statehood. Due to an initially minor settler American population, it did not have a separate government until 1859 and was under the administration of Sonoma County prior to that. Some of the county's land was given to Sonoma County between 1850 and 1860.

The county derives its name from Cape Mendocino (most of which is actually located in adjacent Humboldt County), which was probably named in honor of either Antonio de Mendoza, Viceroy of New Spain, 1535–1542 (who sent the Juan Rodríguez Cabrillo Expedition to this coast in 1542), or Lorenzo Suárez de Mendoza, Viceroy from 1580 to 1583. Mendocino is the adjectival form of the family name of Mendoza.

Neither Spanish nor Mexican influence extended into Mendocino County beyond the establishment of two Mexican land grants in southern Mendocino County: Rancho Sanel in Hopland, in 1844 and Rancho Yokaya that forms the majority of the Ukiah Valley, in 1845.

In the 19th century, despite the establishment of the Mendocino Indian Reservation and Nome Cult Farm in 1856, the county witnessed many of the most serious atrocities in the extermination of the Californian Native American tribes who originally lived in the area, like the Yuki, the Pomo, the Cahto, and the Wintun. The systematic occupation of their lands, the reduction of many of their members into slavery and the raids against their settlements led to the Mendocino War in 1859, where hundreds of Indians were killed.  Establishment of the Round Valley Indian Reservation on March 30, 1870, did not prevent the segregation that continued well into the 20th century. Other tribes from the Sierra Nevada mountains were also relocated to the Round Valley Indian Reservation during the "California Trail Of Tears", where the Natives were forced to march in bad conditions to their new home in Round Valley. Many of these tribes thrown together were not on good terms with the other tribes they were forced to live with on the reservation, resulting in tensions still evident today.

Geography

Adjacent counties
 Humboldt County - north
 Trinity County - north
 Tehama County - northeast
 Glenn County - east
 Lake County - east
 Sonoma County - south

Rivers

 Russian River (inland)
 Gualala River
 Garcia River
 Elk Creek
 Navarro River
 Albion River
 Little River
 Big River
Big Salmon Creek
Little Salmon Creek
 Noyo River
 Pudding Creek
 Virgin Creek
 Ten Mile River
 Usal Creek
 Eel River (inland)

Beaches

 Big River Beach
 Caspar Headlands State Beach
 Van Damme Beach
 Greenwood State Beach
 Seaside Beach
 Westport-Union Landing State Beach
 Manchester State Beach
 Navarro Beach
 Portuguese Beach
 Schooner Gulch State Beach
 Long Valley Creek
 10 Mile Creek
 Glass Beach

National and state protected areas

 Admiral William Standley State Recreation Area
 Caspar Headlands State Recreation Area
 Hendy Woods State Park
 Jug Handle State Reserve
 MacKerricher State Park
 Mailliard Redwoods State Reserve
 Manchester State Park
 Mendocino Coast Botanical Gardens
 Mendocino Headlands State Park
 Mendocino National Forest
 Mendocino Woodlands State Park
 Montgomery Woods State Reserve
 Navarro River Redwoods State Park
 Point Arena State Marine Reserve & Point Arena State Marine Conservation Area
 Point Cabrillo Light Station
 Reynolds Wayside Campground
 Round Valley Indian Reservation
 Russian Gulch State Park
 Saunders Reef State Marine Conservation Area
 Sea Lion Cove State Marine Conservation Area
 Sinkyone Wilderness State Park
 Smythe Redwoods State Reserve
 Standish-Hickey State Recreation Area
 Van Damme State Park

Flora and fauna

Demographics

2020 census

Note: the US Census treats Hispanic/Latino as an ethnic category. This table excludes Latinos from the racial categories and assigns them to a separate category. Hispanics/Latinos can be of any race.

2011

Places by population, race, and income

2010 Census

The 2010 United States Census reported that Mendocino County had a population of 87,841. The racial makeup of Mendocino County was 67,218 (76.5%) White, 622 (0.7%) African American, 4,277 (4.9%) Native American, 1,450 (1.7%) Asian, 119 (0.1%) Pacific Islander, 10,185 (11.6%) from other races, and 3,970 (4.5%) from two or more races. Hispanic or Latino of any race were 19,505 persons (22.2%).

2000
As of the census of 2000, there were 86,265 people, 33,266 households, and 21,855 families residing in the county. The population density was 25 people per square mile (9/km2). There were 36,937 housing units at an average density of 10 per square mile (4/km2). The racial makeup of the county was 80.8% White, 0.6% Black or African American, 4.8% Native American, 1.2% Asian, 0.2% Pacific Islander, 8.6% from other races, and 3.9% from two or more races. 16.5% of the population were Hispanic or Latino of any race. 12.2% were of German, 10.8% English, 8.6% Irish, 6.1% Italian and 5.6% American ancestry according to Census 2000. 84.4% spoke English and 13.2% Spanish as their first language.

There were 33,266 households, out of which 31.4% had children under the age of 18 living with them, 48.9% were married couples living together, 11.7% had a female householder with no husband present, and 34.3% were non-families. 27.0% of all households were made up of individuals, and 10.4% had someone living alone who was 65 years of age or older. The average household size was 2.53 and the average family size was 3.04.

In the county, the population was spread out, with 25.5% under the age of 18, 8.1% from 18 to 24, 25.6% from 25 to 44, 27.1% from 45 to 64, and 13.6% who were 65 years of age or older. The median age was 39 years. For every 100 females there were 98.9 males. For every 100 females age 18 and over, there were 97.1 males.

The median income for a household in the county was $35,996, and the median income for a family was $42,168. Males had a median income of $33,128 versus $23,774 for females. The per capita income for the county was $19,443. About 10.9% of families and 15.9% of the population were below the poverty line, including 21.5% of those under age 18 and 7.7% of those age 65 or over.

Government
As of 2023, the District Attorney of Mendocino County is C. David Eyster, the elected Sheriff-Coroner is Matthew C. Kendall  and the Chief Executive Officer is Darcie Antle.

Mendocino County is legislatively governed by a board of five supervisors, each with a separate district. The first district is represented by Glenn McGourty, and serves the central-eastern region of the county, including Potter Valley, Redwood Valley, Calpella, and Talmage. The second district, represented by Maureen Mulheren, serves Ukiah. The third district, in the northeastern quadrant of the county from Willits north to Laytonville and Covelo, is represented by John Haschak. The fourth district covers the northwestern quadrant of the county, including the coast from Caspar northwards through Fort Bragg; its supervisor is Dan Gjerde, who previously served on the Fort Bragg City Council. The supervisor for the fifth district is Ted Williams; his district covers the southern portion of the county, including the coast from Mendocino to Gualala, the Anderson Valley, the western outskirts of Ukiah, and portions of the Russian River valley near Hopland.

Politics

Voter registration statistics

Cities by population and voter registration

Overview 
Mendocino is a strongly Democratic county in Presidential and congressional elections. The last Republican to win a majority in the county was Californian Ronald Reagan in 1984. However, in the 2016 election, Mendocino County gave Hillary Clinton a reduced margin of victory of any Democratic since Al Gore (though support for third-party candidates more than doubled from 2012). In 2020 the county was won by Joe Biden with an increased margin of victory from the previous election.

  
  
  
  
  
  
  
  
  
  
  
  
  
  
  
  
  
  
  
  
  
  
  
  
  
  
  
  
  
  
  

As of February 2021, the California Secretary of State reports that Mendocino County has 54,505 registered voters. Of those, 26,648 (48.9%) are registered Democratic; 11,387 (20.9%) are registered Republican; 4,389 (8.1%) are registered with other political parties, and 12,082 (22.1%) declined to state a political party.

In 2000, Mendocino County voters approved Measure G, which calls for the decriminalization of marijuana when used and cultivated for personal use. Measure G passed with a 58% majority vote, making it the first county in the United States to declare prosecution of small-scale marijuana offenses the "lowest priority" for local law enforcement. Measure G does not protect individuals who cultivate, transport or possess marijuana for sale. However, Measure G was passed at the local government level affecting only Mendocino County, and therefore does not affect existing state or federal laws. The city of Berkeley has had a similar law (known as the Berkeley Marijuana Initiative II) since 1979 which has generally been found to be unenforceable.

In 2008, the Mendocino County Board of Supervisors placed Measure B on the June 3 county-wide ballot. After three months of hard-fought campaigning and national attention, voters narrowly approved "B", which repealed the provisions of 2000's Measure G. However, opponents of Measure B intend to continue the challenge in court, as the wording of Measure B relies heavily on S.B. 420's state limitations which were recently ruled unconstitutional by the California supreme court. On July 3, the Sheriff and District Attorneys offices announced that they would not be enforcing the new regulations for the time being, citing pending legal challenges and conflicts with existing state law.

In April, 2009, Sheriff Tom Allman issued his department's medical marijuana enforcement policy, which includes the provisions of Measure B and also cites the California Supreme Court Ruling narrowly defining "caregiver" in the state's medical marijuana law.

In 2004, Measure H was passed in Mendocino County with a 56% majority, making it the first county in the United States to ban the production and cultivation of genetically modified organisms.

On Nov. 4, 2008, Mendocino County voted 63.1% against Proposition 8 which amended the California Constitution to define marriage as a union between one man and one woman.

Crime 

The following table includes the number of incidents reported and the rate per 1,000 persons for each type of offense.

Cities by population and crime rates 

A coroner's jury ruled that the 2018 Hart family crash in Mendocino County was deliberate.

Media
Mendocino County is considered part of the San Francisco Bay Area television market, and primarily receives the major Bay Area TV stations.

The county is also served by local and regional newspapers as well as a community radio stations. Community radio stations include KZYX, operating out of Philo, and KLLG, operating out of the Little Lake Grange in Willits. The Humboldt County-based KMUD is also receivable in large parts of the county. Local independent newspapers include the online news service The Mendocino Voice, and The Laytonville Observer, the Anderson Valley Advertiser, the Willits Weekly and the Independent Coast Observer. Four formerly independent newspapers are now owned by the national conglomerate media company Digital First Media, they are: The Ukiah Daily Journal, The Mendocino Beacon, the Willits News, and The Fort Bragg Advocate. These four papers have seen a precipitous decline in the size of editorial staff and in coverage over the past several years, in keeping with the nationwide tactics of DFM. The Sonoma County-based Press Democrat also covers the area.

Education

Community colleges 
 Mendocino College:
 Main campus, Ukiah
 North County Center, Willits
 Coast Center, Fort Bragg
 Pacific Union College's Albion Biological Field Station

Universities 
 Dharma Realm Buddhist University

K-12 education 

School districts include:

Unified:

 Anderson Valley Unified School District
 Fort Bragg Unified School District
 Laytonville Unified School District
 Leggett Valley Unified School District
 Mendocino Unified School District
 Potter Valley Community Unified School District
 Round Valley Unified School District
 Southern Humboldt Joint Unified School District
 Ukiah Unified School District
 Willits Unified School District

Secondary:
 Point Arena Joint Union High School District

Elementary:
 Arena Union Elementary School District
 Manchester Union Elementary School District

Transportation

Major highways

  State Route 1
  U.S. Route 101
  State Route 20
  State Route 128
  State Route 162
  State Route 175
  State Route 222 (unsigned)
  State Route 253
  State Route 271

Public transportation

Bus
The Mendocino Transit Authority provides local and intercity bus service within Mendocino County. Limited service also connects with transit in Sonoma County. Greyhound Bus Lines currently serves Ukiah.

Amtrak's operates connecting bus service to Ukiah, Willits and Laytonville.

The historic Skunk Train is a heritage railway that connects Fort Bragg, California with Willits using steam locomotives.

Airports
 Ukiah Municipal Airport is a general aviation airport owned by the City of Ukiah. It is located south of downtown Ukiah.
 Little River Airport is a general aviation airport serving the Mendocino coast.
 Willits Municipal Airport is a general aviation airport serving the Willits / Little Lake Valley area. Located in the Brooktrails subdivision area west of Willits.
 Round Valley Airport is a general aviation airport serving the Covelo / Round Valley area.
 Boonville Airport (California) is a general aviation airport serving the Boonville / Anderson Valley area.
 Ocean Ridge Airport is a privately owned general aviation airport serving the Gualala area.
For commercial service, passengers in Mendocino County need to go to Eureka, one county to the north in Humboldt County, or to Sonoma County Airport in Santa Rosa, Sonoma County, one county to the south. More comprehensive service is available from Sacramento to the east or San Francisco, well to the south.

Emergency services for the largely unincorporated county are coordinated through Howard Forest Station, a local Cal Fire station just south of Willits.

Communities

Cities
 Fort Bragg
 Point Arena
 Ukiah (county seat)
 Willits

Census-designated places

 Albion
 Anchor Bay
 Boonville
 Brooktrails
 Calpella
 Caspar
 Cleone
 Comptche
 Covelo
 Hopland (formerly Sanel)
 Laytonville
 Leggett
 Little River
 Manchester
 Mendocino
 Philo
 Potter Valley
 Redwood Valley
 Talmage

Unincorporated communities

 Branscomb
 Dos Rios
 Elk
 Gualala
 Inglenook
 Longvale
 Navarro
 Noyo
 Old Hopland
 Piercy
 Pine Grove
 Rockport
 Wanhala
 Westport
 Yorkville

Indian reservations
Mendocino County has nine Indian reservations lying within its borders, the fourth most of any county in the United States (after San Diego County, California; Sandoval County, New Mexico; and Riverside County, California).

 Coyote Valley Reservation
 Guidiville Rancheria
 Hopland Rancheria
 Laytonville Rancheria
 Manchester-Point Arena Rancheria
 Pinoleville Rancheria
 Redwood Valley Rancheria
 Round Valley Reservation (partly in Trinity County)
 Sherwood Valley Rancheria

Population ranking
The population ranking of the following table is based on the 2010 census of Mendocino County.

† county seat

In popular culture
"Mendocino" by The Sir Douglas Quintet was released in December 1968 and reached No. 27 in the U.S. Billboard Hot 100 by early 1969, spending 15 weeks in the chart.

Kate McGarrigle's song "(Talk to Me of) Mendocino," is one of the songs on the McGarrigles' 1975 debut album; it has been covered by Linda Ronstadt on her 1982 album Get Closer, and by the English singer-songwriter John Howard on his 2007 E.P., and also by Bette Midler on her 2014 album It's The Girls.

A song written by Matt Serletic and Bernie Taupin, "Mendocino County Line" which was released in 2002, is about a love that could not last and cites the 'Mendocino County Line' in the chorus.

Many films and movies have been filmed in and around Mendocino County, including Dying Young, The Russians Are Coming; Overboard; The Dunwich Horror; The Karate Kid Part III; Dead & Buried; Forever Young; Same Time Next Year; Racing with the Moon; Pontiac Moon; and The Majestic.

See also

 National Register of Historic Places listings in Mendocino County, California
 California Historical Landmarks in Mendocino County, California
 Sequoia County, California

Notes

Footnotes

Further reading
 California Legislature, Special Joint Committee on the Mendocino War, Majority and Minority Reports of the Special Joint Committee on the Mendocino War. Sacramento, CA: Charles T. Botts, State Printer, 1860.
 Aurelius O. Carpenter and Percy H. Millberry, History of Mendocino and Lake Counties, California: With Biographical Sketches of the Leading Men and Women of the Counties Who Have Been Identified with their Growth and Development from the Early Days to the Present. Los Angeles, CA: Historic Record Co., 1914.
 V.K. Chesnut, Plants Used by the Indians of Mendocino County, California. Washington, DC: U.S. Government Printing Office, 1902.
 Thomas N. Layton, Western Pomo Prehistory: Excavations at Albion Head, Nightbirds' Retreat, and Three Chop Village, Mendocino County, California. Los Angeles, CA: Institute of Archaeology, University of California, Los Angeles, 1990.
 M.B. Levick, Mendocino County, California. San Francisco, CA: Sunset Magazine Homeseekers' Bureau, n.d. [c. 1912].
 Mendocino County Chamber of Commerce, Mendocino County, California. Beverly Hills, CA: Windsor Publications, 1968.
 Lyman Palmer, History of Mendocino County, California, Comprising Its Geography, Geology, Topography, Climatography, Springs and Timber. San Francisco, CA: Alley, Bowen and Co., 1880.
 John A. Parducci, Six Decades of Making Wine in Mendocino County, California. Berkeley, CA: Regional Oral History Office, Bancroft Library, University of California, 1992.
 G. Yoell Parkhurst, Mendocino County, California. San Francisco, CA: Sunset Magazine Homeseekers' Bureau, 1909.

External links

 
 Mendocino County Tourism Commission website
 Mendocino County and Coast Travel Directory
 Mendocino County Museum
 Mendocino's Movie History - Information and Video
 Hiking trails in Mendocino County at WikiSpot

 
California counties
1850 establishments in California
Populated places established in 1850